U.S. Route 10 or U.S. Highway 10 (US 10) is an east–west United States Numbered Highway located in the Midwest and Great Lakes regions of the U.S. Unlike most U.S. Highways with "0" as the last digit of its route number, US 10 is not a cross-country highway. US 10 was one of the original long-haul highways, running from Detroit, Michigan, to Seattle, Washington, but then lost much of its length when new Interstate Highways were built on top of its right-of-way.

US 10 used to be broken into two segments by Lake Michigan. In 2015, the ferry  between Ludington, Michigan, and Manitowoc, Wisconsin, was officially designated as part of the highway. The ferry operates only between May and October.

The eastern terminus of US 10 is in Bay City, Michigan, at its interchange with Interstate 75 (I-75) (near US 10's milepost 139 and I-75's milepost 162). The western terminus of US 10 is in the city of West Fargo, North Dakota, at its interchange with I-94.

Route description

|-
|ND
|
|-
|MN
|
|-
|WI
|
|-
|MI
|
|-
|Total
|
|}

North Dakota

It is one of the primary east–west streets in West Fargo and Fargo and is called Main Avenue for its entire length in North Dakota. At the Red River, US 10 crosses over a bridge to Moorhead, Minnesota.

Minnesota

US 10 is a major divided highway for almost all of its length in Minnesota. The road enters Minnesota in Moorhead and travels through Detroit Lakes, Wadena, Staples, Little Falls, St. Cloud, and Elk River. It becomes a freeway in Anoka and passes through the northern suburbs of Minneapolis and Saint Paul, It enters Saint Paul paired with I-35E and exits Saint Paul paired with US 61. It leaves US 61 just north of Hastings, shortly before entering into Wisconsin.

Wisconsin

US 10 enters Wisconsin at Prescott and travels southeastward passing Durand, Neillsville, Marshfield, Stevens Point, and Appleton before reaching its eastern terminus near the Lake Michigan shore in Manitowoc. Ferry service between the western and eastern portions of US 10 is provided between May and October by the ferry . This allows travelers to bypass Auburndale, Blenker, Milladore, Junction City, and downtown Stevens Point. This completes the plan to upgrade US 10 to a freeway or expressway status from Marshfield to Menasha. US 10 is an expressway between Stevens Point and Waupaca. It has been upgraded to a freeway in the Waupaca area and is also a freeway between Fremont and Appleton.

Michigan

The western terminus of US 10 in Michigan is Ludington. US 10 runs concurrently with US 31 from the east side of Ludington to Scottville before US 31 turns northward. The road then heads easterly through Baldwin and Reed City before it becomes a freeway west of US 127 near the junction with highway M-115. US 127 and US 10 overlap for a short distance near Clare. US 10 bypasses Midland and terminates at I-75 in Bay City.

History

Originally, US 10 also passed through Montana (including a segment of what is now Montana Highway 2 [MT 2]), the Idaho Panhandle, and Washington, terminating in Seattle. The completion of I-90 and I-94 replaced US 10 along this route, although some sections of the old US 10 road still exist in such cities as Bismarck, Missoula, Spokane, and between Cle Elum and Ellensburg as State Route 10 (SR 10). The last section of I-90 to be completed was between Coeur d'Alene and Wallace in the early 1990s. Much of this route was conumbered as both I-90 and US 10 until the final completion of I-90 through Idaho. Some decommissioned sections of US 10 are designated I-90 Business (I-90 Bus.) or I-94 Bus. routes. At least two US 10 Alternate (US 10 Alt.) routes were used, including one from Spokane to Missoula from 1941 to 1967 via Sandpoint, Idaho (represented today by US 2, State Highway 200, MT 200 and US 93), and the Pintler Scenic Route through Philipsburg, and Anaconda, renamed MT 1 when  US 10 split between Garrison and Three Forks into US 10N and US 10S from 1936 until 1960. US 10N through Helena and dropping into Three Forks, while the Southern section of the split followed US 10's traditional routing through Deer Lodge and Butte, Montana, to get across the Rocky Mountains. Previous to the split, US 10N was designated as another US 10 Alt.

At the eastern end, US 10 originally went south from Midland to Saginaw, Michigan, on what is now highway M-47. It then joined up with US 23 in Saginaw and continued south until it split from US 23 near Flint. It then continued southeast as the Dixie Highway to Pontiac, where it followed Woodward Avenue, now designated M-1. From there, US 10 continued on an almost straight line to Downtown Detroit, where it intersected US 16, US 25, and US 12. It then took a two-block jog and then ended at the Detroit–Windsor tunnel to Canada.

In the 1970s, US 10 was rerouted off Woodward Avenue in Metro Detroit and onto the John C. Lodge Freeway (formerly Business Spur 696, now M-10) and Telegraph Road. US 10 was truncated to Bay City, Michigan, in 1986 at which point the Lodge Freeway was changed to M-10.

In 1925, US 10 was originally proposed to run from Detroit through Chicago, and northwesterly into Wisconsin on what later became US 12.

In 2015, the American Association of State Highway and Transportation Officials officially designated the  car ferry as part of the highway's official route, joining US 9 as the only two routes with a ferry connection.

Major intersections
North Dakota
 in West Fargo
 in Fargo
Minnesota
 in Moorhead. The highways travel concurrently through the city.
 in Detroit Lakes
 in Wadena
 in Elk River. The highways travel concurrently to Anoka.
 on the Mounds View–Shoreview city line. The highways travel concurrently to the Mounds View–Arden Hills city line.
 in Arden Hills. The highways travel concurrently to Little Canada.
 in Little Canada. I-35E/US 10 travel concurrently to Saint Paul.
 in Saint Paul. I-94/US 10 travel concurrently through the city.
 in Saint Paul. The highways travel concurrently to Denmark Township.
 in Newport
Wisconsin
 west of Ellsworth. The highways travel concurrently to east of Ellsworth.
 west of Osseo. The highways travel concurrently to Osseo.
 in Osseo
 south of Fairchild. The highways travel concurrently to east-southeast of Fairchild.
 north-northwest of Stevens Point. The highways travel concurrently to Stevens Point.
 east-southeast of Fremont.
 north of Neenah
 northwest of Manitowoc. The highways travel concurrently to west of Manitowoc.
 in Manitowoc
 SS Badger in Manitowoc. US 10 utilizes the ship as a car ferry across Lake Michigan to Ludington, Michigan.
Michigan
 SS Badger in Ludington.
 in Amber Township. The highways travel concurrently through the township.
 in Richmond Township
 in Grant Township. The highways travel concurrently to Clare.
 in Monitor Township

Related routes
US 10 has had alternate routes designated in the past, but none are active as of 2017. A multistate alternate route between Washington and Montana was largely replaced in 1947 by the western extension of US 2 and later decommissioned entirely in 1967.

Between 1926 and 1934, there was a pair of suffixed routes between St. Cloud, Minnesota, and Moorhead, Minnesota. US 10N, the northern half of the pairing, connected St. Cloud, Little Falls, Motley, and Detroit Lakes before reaching Moorhead. US 10S ran from St. Cloud through Alexandria and Fergus Falls before rejoining US 10N at Moorhead. In the mid-1930s, US 52 was extended into Minnesota, and US 10S was renamed to US 52 (now I-94). US 10N was renamed to US 10.

See also

 U.S. Route 110
 U.S. Route 210
 U.S. Route 310
 U.S. Route 410

References

External links

Endpoints of US 10

 
10
10
10
10
10